Centaurea idaea is a species of flowering plant in the family Asteraceae. It is endemic to Crete.

References

idaea
Taxa named by Pierre Edmond Boissier
Taxa named by Theodor von Heldreich